York is a town in York County, Maine, United States, near the southern tip of the state. The population in the 2020 census was 13,723. Situated beside the Atlantic Ocean on the Gulf of Maine, York is a well-known summer resort town. It is home to three 18-hole golf clubs, four sandy beaches, and Mount Agamenticus. It includes the villages of York Village, York Harbor, York Beach and Cape Neddick.

York is part of the Portland metropolitan area.

History

First settled by Europeans in 1624, the plantation was originally called Agamenticus, the Abenaki term for the York River. In 1638, settlers changed the name to Bristol after Bristol, England, from which they had immigrated. Envisioning a great city arising from the wilderness, Sir Ferdinando Gorges, lord proprietor of Maine under the Plymouth patent, named the capital of his province Gorgeana. On March 1, 1642, by charter of King Charles I, Gorgeana became the first incorporated city in America.

Following Gorges' death, the Massachusetts Bay Colony claimed his dominion. In 1652, York, Massachusetts, was incorporated from a portion of Gorgeana, making it the second oldest town in Maine after Kittery, incorporated two years earlier. It was named for York, England; however, control of the region was contested between New England and New France, which incited Native Americans to attack English settlements throughout the French and Indian Wars.

The first Congregational church of York was organized in 1672, by Rev. Shubael Dummer, the son of Richard Dummer and uncle to William Dummer, who became acting governor of the Province of Massachusetts Bay.

During King William's War, York was destroyed in the Candlemas Massacre of 1692. During the raid by the Abenakis, Dummer was shot at his own front door. About 50 others were slain and near 100 carried away captive, among them Dummer's wife, Lydia, and their son, where "through snows and hardships among those dragons of the desert she also quickly died"; nothing further was heard of the boy.

The final local Indian attack occurred at the Cape Neddick area during Dummer's War in 1723. Hostilities diminished with the French defeat at the Siege of Louisbourg (1745), and ceased altogether with the 1763 Treaty of Paris.

Trading center
As provincial capital and site of the Royal Gaol (Jail), York prospered. Numerous wharves and warehouses serviced trade with the West Indies. Agricultural products and lumber were shipped in exchange for sugar, molasses and other commodities. One notable merchant was John Hancock, whose establishment is now a museum. Following the Revolution, however, President Thomas Jefferson's Embargo Act of 1807 crippled trade. York, bereft of status as capitol, would not again be prosperous until after the Civil War, when its sea breezes and colonial charm, including old homes like the John Sedgley Homestead, attracted tourists.

Present day
Like Bar Harbor and Newport, Rhode Island, York became a fashionable summer resort, and retains many distinctive examples of Gilded Age architecture, particularly in the Shingle style. A cluster of historic buildings in the center of York Village are maintained as museums by the Old York Historical Society.

The Yorks

 York Village – including the historic structures, and upscale shops
 York Harbor – with a number of inns, historic homes and large estates
 York Beach – with attractions such as a zoo, arcades, souvenir shops and stores
 Cape Neddick – mainly residences, best known for its lighthouse

During summer months, summer residents and tourists visit Short Sands Beach, which is in the district of York Beach itself, as well as Long Sands Beach, the town's longest with more than a mile of sand stretching between York Beach and York Harbor. A number of five-star hotels and other accommodations operate in the York Beach area, although most close after summer.

A number of spots throughout The Yorks have views of the Cape Neddick Light at Nubble Rock, which has figured in both artists' work and souvenirs of the Maine coast. A photo of the Cape Neddick Light is on the Voyager 1 spacecraft labeled as Seashore, Maine. Old-fashioned restaurants, like the Goldenrod, maintain the historic character of the York Beach area.

Geography
The York watershed drains into the York River. A road travels to the summit, where miles of hiking, biking and horse-riding trails are available. The lowest point in town is sea level, along the coastline with the Atlantic Ocean.

Government

York has a council-manager form of government.

Voter registration

32.61% Republican, 23.44% Democrat, 0.9% Green, 43.05% Unenrolled.

Education

York School Department receives the largest portion (69%) of the town's budget. The town of York supports 2,000 students in four schools. Village Elementary School serves grades K–1. Coastal Ridge Elementary School provides education for grades 2–4. York Middle School serves students in grades 5–8, and York High School serves students in grades 9–12. Adult education is also available to York residents.

Demographics

See Cape Neddick, Maine and York Harbor, Maine for demographic information compiled for the respective villages.

2010 census

As of the census of 2010, there were 12,529 people, 5,440 households, and 3,601 families living in the town. The racial makeup of the town was 98.6% White, 0.4% African American, 0.1% Native American, 0.8% Asian, 0.3% from other races, and 0.8% from two or more races. Hispanic or Latino of any race were 1.0% of the population.

There were 5,440 households, of which 26.0% had children under the age of 18 living with them, 56.1% were married couples living together, 7.1% had a female householder with no husband present, 3.0% had a male householder with no wife present, and 33.8% were non-families. 28.5% of all households were made up of individuals, and 15.1% had someone living alone who was 65 years of age or older. The average household size was 2.30 and the average family size was 2.82.

The median age in the town was 49.3 years. 20.2% of residents were under the age of 18; 4.9% were between the ages of 18 and 24; 17.1% were from 25 to 44; 36.3% were from 45 to 64; and 21.5% were 65 years of age or older. The gender makeup of the town was 47.9% male and 52.1% female.

2000 census

As of the census of 2000, there were 12,854 people, 5,235 households, and 3,690 families living in the town. The racial makeup of the town was 98.36% White, 0.25% African American, 0.11% Native American, 0.49% Asian, 0.02% Pacific Islander, 0.19% from other races, and 0.58% from two or more races. Hispanic or Latino of any race were 0.72% of the population.

There were 5,235 households, out of which 29.5% had children under the age of 18 living with them, 61.1% were married couples living together, 7.0% had a female householder with no husband present, and 29.5% were non-families. 24.0% of all households were made up of individuals, and 9.9% had someone living alone who was 65 years of age or older. The average household size was 2.42 and the average family size was 2.88.

In the town, the population was spread out, with 22.8% under the age of 18, 4.3% from 18 to 24, 25.7% from 25 to 44, 30.1% from 45 to 64, and 17.0% who were 65 years of age or older. The median age was 43 years. For every 100 females, there were 91.8 males. For every 100 females age 18 and over, there were 88.7 males.

The median income for a household in the town was $64,000, and the median income for a family was $73,400. Males had a median income of $49,415 versus $31,743 for females. The per capita income for the town was $30,895. About 1.3% of families and 3.8% of the population were below the poverty line, including 1.8% of those under the age of 18 and 6.7% of those 65 and older.

Sites of interest

 Cape Neddick Lighthouse (Nubble Light)
 John Sedgley Homestead
 The Goldenrod
 Short Sands Beach
 Mount Agamenticus

Civil War monument
A granite monument depicting a Civil War soldier was erected in 1906 at a traffic triangle in York Village. It has been suggested by some that his uniform appears to be incorrect for a Union soldier, as he wears a brimmed fedora and goatee; some local tour guides claim that the uniform is actually Confederate. Another explanation is that either the sculptor, Englishman Frederick Barnicoat, or designer John Staples, mistakenly depicted a uniform from the time of the Spanish–American War. It is also possible that the 20th Maine Volunteer Infantry Regiment did wear a similar uniform.

Notable people 

 Spencer Albee, musician
 Emerson Baker, historian, author
 Christopher Cassidy, NASA astronaut
 Mandy Cronin, ice hockey executive 
 Shubael Dummer, colonial reverend and leader
 Richard Foerster, poet
 Tim Janis, musician
 Barbara Marois, Olympic field hockey player
 Rufus McIntire, US congressman
 Jeremiah Moulton, colonial officer, judge
 David N. Ott, state representative, lawyer
 Alvah T. Ramsdell, architect
 Neil Rolde, state legislator and Maine historian
 Duncan Robinson (basketball), basketball player for the Miami Heat
 May Sarton, writer
 George Thatcher, state judge, US congressman
 Mark Twain, writer (summer resident)
 Windol Weaver, state legislator

Gallery

References

External links

 Town of York official website
 York Public Library
 Old York Historical Society
 York School Department
 Boon Island Lighthouse
 Cape Neddick Lighthouse (Nubble Light)
 Maine Genealogy: York, York County, Maine

 
Populated places established in 1638
Portland metropolitan area, Maine
Towns in York County, Maine
Towns in Maine
Populated coastal places in Maine
1638 establishments in the Thirteen Colonies